Chlidichthys abruptus, or St Brandon's dottyback, is a species of fish in the family Pseudochromidae.

Description

Distribution and habitat
Chlidichthys abruptus is endemic to an archipelago called the Cargados Carajos Shoals in the Indian Ocean.

References

Gill, A.C. and A.J. Edwards, 2004. Revision of the Indian Ocean dottyback fish genera Chlidichthys and Pectinochromis (Perciformes: Pseudochromidae: Pseudoplesiopinae). Smithiana Bull. 3:1-52. 

Pseudoplesiopinae
Taxa named by Roger Lubbock
Fish described in 1977